José Mario Tranquillini (born 23 October 1962) is a Brazilian judoka. He competed in the men's heavyweight event at the 1992 Summer Olympics.

References

1962 births
Living people
Brazilian male judoka
Olympic judoka of Brazil
Judoka at the 1992 Summer Olympics
Place of birth missing (living people)
Pan American Games medalists in judo
Pan American Games gold medalists for Brazil
Judoka at the 1995 Pan American Games
21st-century Brazilian people
20th-century Brazilian people